Sierra Maestra Airport  is a regional airport that serves the city of Manzanillo in Cuba.

Airlines and destinations

Facilities

The airport has only one terminal handling domestic and international flights. No air bridges are available and passenger must use air stairs and walk to or from tarmac to the terminal.

Besides currency exchange booth and VIP lounge there are no other services inside the terminal. Refreshment vendors are located outside the terminal.

Transport

Taxis and prearranged buses from tour groups are only means to connect from airport to the city.

References

Airports in Cuba
Manzanillo, Cuba
Buildings and structures in Granma Province